Non-zero or nonzero may refer to:
Non-zero dispersion-shifted fiber, a type of single-mode optical fiber
Non zero one, artist collective from London, UK
Non-zero-sum game, used in game theory and economic theory
Non Zero Sumness, 2002 album by Planet Funk
 In mathematics, a non-zero element is any element of an algebraic structure other than the zero element.
Nonzero: The Logic of Human Destiny, 1999 book by Robert Wright
Nonzero Records, independent record label based in Sydney, Australia

See also
0 (number)
Null (disambiguation)